This is a list of diplomatic missions of Iceland.

In countries without Icelandic representation, Icelandic citizens can seek assistance from public officials in the foreign services of any of the other Nordic countries, in accordance with the Helsinki Treaty.

Current missions

Africa

Americas

Asia

Europe

Multilateral organizations

Gallery

Closed missions

Africa

Americas

Asia

Europe

See also 
 List of diplomatic missions of the Nordic countries

Notes

References

External links
Ministry of Foreign Affairs of Iceland
Diplomatic Missions of Iceland

 
Iceland
Diplomatic missions